Sureyya Ciliv is a business executive who is currently Chairman of System Capital, System Morgan and Kuika Inc.  Between 2007 - 2015, Ciliv was the  Chief Executive Officer (CEO) of Turkcell Group - the leading technology and communications company in Turkey, a  NYSE listed company with 72 million subscribers in 8 countries.  Previously, he held executive positions at Microsoft Corporation between 1997 - 2007.  Sureyya Ciliv received the Global CEO of the Year Award at World Communication Awards in 2009.

Biography 

Sureyya Ciliv graduated with summa cum laude from the University of Michigan in 1981 in Industry & Operations Engineering and Computer Engineering. He went on to receive his graduate degree, MBA from Harvard Business School in 1983.

Ciliv served as the President and CEO of Novasoft Systems Inc., a company he co-founded in Boston, MA.   In 1997, he was appointed as the CEO of Microsoft Turkey, and held the position for 3 years. Between 2000 and 2007, he served in various executive management positions at Microsoft Office, Global Sales, Marketing in Redmond, WA. In 2007, he was appointed as the CEO of Turkcell. Under his tenure, Turkcell was globally recognized as a leader in telecommunications and mobile services, elected as the "Most Admired Company" in Turkey seven times in 8 years.

References 

1958 births
Turkish chief executives
American people of Turkish descent
Living people
University of Michigan College of Engineering alumni
Harvard Business School alumni
Chief operating officers